Vikas (born 9 February)  is an Indian actor, director and writer who works predominantly in Karnataka Film Industry.

Personal life 
Vikas was born on 9 February in Bangalore, Karnataka. His major claim to fame was directing Jayammana Maga for Duniya Vijay which was a blockbuster.   He is currently acting in the movie Kanadante Mayavadanu (poster) which is slated to be released in the last quarter of 2019.

Career 
Vikas started as an assistant director in Television Serials, fell in love with the editing machine the first time he saw it and became an editor. Directors working with him offered character roles in serials. Television Serials like Kadambari and guptagamini gave him recognition as an actor.  Vikas made his film debut with the film Nandhi Starring Sudeep where he plays as Sudeep's friend. He assisted director Duniya Soori for Jackie (2010) where he also played the role of an antagonist "Parangi Seena" in the movie. He assisted the film maker Yogaraj Bhat and co-wrote the film Drama where he was credited for writing the screenplay as "ravikiran".  He directed Jayammana Maga starring Duniya Vijay which went on to become a blockbuster. The subject dealt with occult and black magic. The response from critics was equally good. filmibeat gave it a rating of 4/5 stars. stating that the movie was not be missed. Times of India rated it a 3.5/5 and said Vikas has proved that he can be a part of the list of talented directors in sandalwood. Jayammana Maga Movie Review {3.5/5}: Critic Review of Jayammana Maga by Times of India Bharatstudent rated it 3.25/5 stating that the presentation was rich and the narrative was energetic. He has played a character role in Kaddipudi.

Vikas wrote the story of Doddmane Huduga starring Puneeth Rajkumar which was a commercial success. He was nominated for the best debutant director for South Indian International Movie Awards in the year 2014.

At present, Vikas is acting in the movie Kaanadante Maayavadanu. He has penned the story along with the debutante Director Raj Pathipati. It is a fantasy film which has a tag line "Love story of a Ghost". The film is the final stages of Post-production.

Filmography

References

External links 

 

"Kaanadante Maayavadanu Official Website"

1975 births
21st-century Indian male actors
Indian film directors
Living people